This is an order of battle of the British 4th Armoured Brigade during the Second World War. Many units either served with or were briefly attached to the brigade.  The order of battle is given for a number of battles the brigade fought in and reflect the changes to the composition of Armoured Brigades as dictated by the War Office, not all of which were, or could be, applied to units in the field.

Order of battle

Egypt September 1939
Titled Heavy Armoured Brigade (Egypt) an Infantry Tank brigade, part of the Armoured Division (Egypt).
 1st Royal Tank Regiment
 6th Royal Tank Regiment

Sidi Barrani December 1940

Equipped with Cruiser tanks, part of 7th Armoured Division.
 7th Hussars
 2nd Royal Tank Regiment

Tobruk December 1941

With 7th Armoured Division.
 8th Hussars
 3rd Royal Tank Regiment
 5th Royal Tank Regiment

Defence of Alamein 20 July 1942

Organised as an Armoured Brigade Group part of 7th Armoured Division.
 4th/8th Hussars
 11th Hussars
 12th Lancers
 9th Battalion, Rifle Brigade
 3rd Regiment, Royal Horse Artillery
 Troop from 113th Light Anti-Aircraft Battery Royal Artillery (RA)
 Troop from 3rd Field Squadron Royal Engineers (RE)
 5th and 56th Companies Royal Army Service Corps (RASC)
 14th Light Field Ambulance Royal Army Medical Corps (RAMC)

Alamein October–November 1942

A brigade group attached to 7th Armoured Division, then X Corps.
 4th/8th Hussars
 11th Hussars
 Royal Scots Greys
 2nd Derbyshire Yeomanry
 1st Battalion, King's Royal Rifle Corps
 3rd Regiment, Royal Horse Artillery
 Troop from 42nd Light Anti-Aircraft Battery RA
 Troop from 21st Field Squadron RE
 5th and 56th Companies RASC
 14th Light Field Ambulance RAMC

Mareth Line 16–23 March 1943

A brigade group attached to X Corps.
 1st The Royal Dragoons
 1st King's Dragoon Guards
 2nd Battalion, King's Royal Rifle Corps
 3rd Regiment, Royal Horse Artillery
 Troop from 42nd Light Anti-Aircraft Battery
 Troop from 4th Field Squadron RE
 5th and 56th Companies RASC
 14th Light Field Ambulance RAMC

Caen 4–8 July 1944

A brigade group attached to VIII Corps.
 Royal Scots Greys
 3rd/4th County of London Yeomanry (Sharpshooters)
 44th Royal Tank Regiment
 2nd Battalion, King's Royal Rifle Corps

The Rhineland 8 February to 1 April 1945

Organised as a brigade group attached at various times to VIII Corps, 11th Armoured Division and XII Corps.
 Royal Scots Greys
 3rd/4th County of London Yeomanry (Sharpshooters)
 44th Royal Tank Regiment
 2nd Battalion, King's Royal Rifle Corps

Other units also served with the brigade
 50th Royal Tank Regiment
 1st East Riding Yeomanry
 1st Regiment, Royal Horse Artillery
 104th (Essex Yeomanry) Regiment, Royal Horse Artillery
 78th Field Regiment, RA

See also

 British armoured formations of the Second World War

Notes

References

Bibliography

External links
 

4
British 4th Armoured Brigade, World War II
4th Armoured Brigade, World War II